The Pyongyang Declaration, officially titled Let Us Defend and Advance the Cause of Socialism, was a statement signed by a number of political parties on 20 April 1992 that calls for the unity of the socialist camp and a vow to safeguard socialism. Representatives of 70 communist and socialist parties from 51 countries arrived in Pyongyang to celebrate Kim Il-sung's 80th birthday. While there, the delegates had many bilateral and multilateral contacts with each other and decided to issue a declaration reiterating their commitment to socialism in spite of the collapse of the USSR and a number of other communist regimes in recent years. On 20 April the declaration was signed by delegates of 69 parties, including 48 party leaders.

Text 
This translation of the Declaration appeared in Proletarian 18 (June 2007):

The representatives of political parties from different countries of the world who are striving for the victory of socialism publish this declaration with a firm conviction to defend and advance the socialist cause.

Ours is an era of independence and the socialist cause is a sacred one aimed at realising the independence of the popular masses.

Socialism suffered a setback in some countries in recent years. As a consequence of this, the imperialists and reactionaries are claiming that socialism has ‘come to an end’. This is nothing but a sophistry to beautify and embellish capitalism and patronise the old order.

The setback of socialism and the revival of capitalism in some countries is causing a great loss to the achievement of the socialist cause, but it can never be interpreted as the denial of the superiority of socialism and of the reactionary character of capitalism.

Socialism has long been the ideal of mankind and it represents the future of mankind.

Socialist society is, in essence, a genuine society for the people where the popular masses are the masters of everything and everything serves them.

But the capitalist society is an unfair one where ‘the rich get ever richer and the poor poorer’. In this society money decides everything, exploitation of man by man predominates and a handful of exploiter classes lord it over all. It is inevitably accompanied by political non-rights, unemployment, poverty, drugs, crimes and other kinds of all social evils which trample human dignity underfoot.

Only socialism can eliminate domination, subjugation and social inequality of all kinds and ensure the people substantial freedom, equality, true democracy and human rights.

The popular masses have long carried on an arduous struggle for the victory of socialism and shed much blood in this course.

The path of socialism is an untrodden one and, therefore, the advance of socialism is inevitably accompanied by trials and difficulties.
One of the reasons for the unsuccessful construction of socialism in some countries is that they failed to build a social structure conforming to the fundamental requirements of the popular masses and build socialism suited to the demand of the theory of scientific socialism.

The guarantee for the advance of a socialist society lies in that the popular masses become the genuine masters of the society.

Such a society makes a triumphant advance – this is a truth and reality proved by theory and practice.

The parties and progressive mankind aspiring after socialism have drawn a very precious lesson therefrom.

In order to defend and advance the socialist cause individual parties should firmly maintain independence and firmly build up their own forces.

The socialist movement is an independent one. Socialism is carved out and built with a country or national state as a unit. The socialist cause in each country should be fulfilled on the responsibility of the party and people of that country.

Each party should work out lines and policies which tally with the actual situation of the country where it is active and with the demands of its people and implement them by relying on the popular masses.

It should not abandon its revolutionary principles at any time and under any circumstances but uplift the banner of socialism.

The socialist cause is a national one and, at the same time, a common cause of mankind.

All parties should cement the ties of comradely unity, cooperation and solidarity on the principles of independence and equality.

Now that the imperialists and reactionaries are attacking socialism and people in an international collusion, the parties which are building socialism or aspiring after it should defend and advance socialism on an international scale and strengthen mutual support and solidarity in their efforts for social justice, democracy, the right to existence and peace against imperialist domination, subjugation by capital and neo-colonialism.

This is an international duty incumbent upon all parties and progressive forces for socialism and an undertaking for their own cause.

We will advance under the unfurled banner of socialism in firm unity with all progressive political parties, organisations, and peoples of the world who are striving to defend socialism against capitalism and imperialism.

Let us all fight it out to open up the future of mankind with a firm conviction in the cause of socialism.

Final victory is on the part of the people fighting in unity for socialism.

The socialist cause shall not perish.

Signatories 
The Declaration was originally signed on 20 April 1992 by 69 parties. Of the original signatories, only two – Workers' Party of Korea and the  Mongolian People's Revolutionary Party – were major parties. The Mongolian party later withdrew from the declaration. According to KCNA, "Six months later, the number of signatories reached more than 140. "They numbered over 170 one year later". At the time of the ten-year anniversary in 2002 there were 258 signatories. In 2012 there were 280. The number of signatories reached 300 in 2017. North Korea often cites these numbers for propaganda purposes.

See also 

International Meeting of Communist and Workers' Parties
Initiative of Communist and Workers' Parties
Our Socialism Centred on the Masses Shall not Perish

References

Works cited

External links 
 Full text of the 'Pyongyang Declaration' at  Proletarian On Line website, Communist Party of Great Britain ( Marxist Leninist), 18 June 2007. Accessed March 2011

Marxism–Leninism
Communism in North Korea
Politics of North Korea
1992 in North Korea